Tartu is the second largest city in Estonia after Tallinn. Tartu has a population of 91,407 (as of 2021). Tartu lies on the Emajõgi river, which connects the two largest lakes in Estonia, Lake Võrtsjärv and Lake Peipus. From the 13th century until the end of the 19th century, Tartu was known in most of the world by variants of its historical name Dorpat.

Tartu, the largest urban centre of southern Estonia, is often considered the "intellectual capital city" of the country, especially as it is home to the nation's oldest and most renowned university, the University of Tartu (founded in 1632).   Tartu also houses the Supreme Court of Estonia, the Ministry of Education and Research, the Estonian National Museum, and the oldest Estonian-language theatre, Vanemuine. It is also the birthplace of the Estonian Song Festivals.

Tartu will be the European Capital of Culture in 2024.

Names and etymology

Since Estonia became an independent country in 1918, the Estonian-language Tartu, alternative South Estonian spelling: Tarto) has been the only name in official use but throughout its history there have also been various names for it in other languages. Most of them derive ultimately from the earliest attested form, the Estonian Tarbatu. Similarly the city has been known as Tērbata in Latvian, and Finnish speakers use the toponym Tartto.
Tartu lies on the Emajõgi river whose name ema jõgi translates to modern Estonian as ‘mother river’.

History

Beginnings
Archaeological evidence of the first permanent settlement on the site of modern Tartu dates to as early as the 5th century AD. By the 7th century, local inhabitants had built a wooden fortification on the east side of Toome Hill (Toomemägi). Over the next centuries the settlement grew, and around 9th–10th centuries became an inland trading center.

The first documented records of the area were made by later mediaeval chroniclers who described the events of the early 11th century Kievan Rus. Yaroslav I the Wise, Grand Prince of Kiev, invaded the region of Tartu in ca 1030, and after a victorious battle with the local tribe of Ungannians built his own fort there, and named it Yuryev. Tartu may have remained under Kievan Rus' control until 1061, when, according to chronicles, the Yuryev fort was burned down by Sosols (probably Oeselians, Sackalians, or another Estonian tribe). Soon afterwards the fort was rebuilt by locals. In the 12th century, local Ungannians on one side and troops from the neighbouring Novgorod Republic on the other side repeatedly raided each other. In those campaigns, the invaders were reportedly able to capture Tartu in 1133 or 1134, and in the winter of 1191–1192, however these temporary captures are not known to have brought any lasting territorial changes.

Medieval bishopric

During the period of Northern Crusades in the beginning of the 13th century the fort of Tarbatu (or Tharbata) was captured by the crusading Teutonic knights — also known as the Brothers of the Sword  — and recaptured by Estonians on several occasions. In 1224, after  the princes of Novgorod and Pskov had sent additional troops led by prince Vyachko of Kukenois to aid the Estonian defenders of the fort, it was besieged and conquered for one last time by the Teutonic crusaders. Subsequently, known as Dorpat (Latin: Tarbatum), Tartu became a commercial centre of considerable importance during the later Middle Ages and the capital of the semi-independent Bishopric of Dorpat.

In 1262 the army of prince Dmitri of Pereslavl launched an assault on Dorpat, capturing and destroying the town. His troops did not manage to capture the bishop's fortress on Toome Hill. The event was recorded both in subsequent German and Old East Slavic chronicles, which also provided the first record of a settlement of German merchants and artisans which had arisen alongside the bishop's fortress.

In medieval times, after the Livonian Order was subsumed into the Teutonic Knights in 1236, the town became an important trading city. In the 1280s Dorpat joined the Hanseatic League.

Polish-Lithuanian and Swedish rule

In 1558, tsar Ivan the Terrible invaded Tartu beginning the Livonian War. Forces under the command of Pyotr Shuiski encircled the town and began the heavy bombardment. In light of this and without any prospect of external help the town surrendered. The local bishop was imprisoned in Moscow, which effectively ended the period of local self-government. Ivan Mikhailovich Viskovatyi, a leading diplomat and archivist of diplomatic records during Ivan the Terrible's reign, argued that Tartu's "founding" by Ancient Rus' justified Russia's contemporary territorial claims to the region. In the effect of the Truce of Jam Zapolski of 1582, the city along with southern regions of Livonian Confederation became part of the Polish–Lithuanian Commonwealth. In 1598 it became the capital of the Dorpat Voivodeship of the Duchy of Livonia. A Jesuit grammar school "Gymnasium Dorpatense" was established in 1583. In addition, a translators' seminary was organized in Tartu and the city received its red and white flag from the Polish king Stephen Báthory.

The activities of both the grammar school and the seminary were stopped by the Polish–Swedish War. Already in late 1600 the forces of Charles IX of Sweden besieged the city defended by three banners of reiters and the city's burghers. Despite repeated assaults, the Swedes could not enter the city. Finally in 1601 Capt. Hermann Wrangel switched sides, assaulted the castellan and opened the gates for the Swedish forces. The town was retaken by Polish–Lithuanian Commonwealth on 13 April 1603 following a brief siege led by hetman Jan Karol Chodkiewicz; roughly 1000 Swedish soldiers surrendered and were escorted to Tallinn.

In the effect of yet another Polish-Swedish War, in 1625 Tartu was once again captured by Sweden, this time for good. In the effect of the 1629 Truce of Altmark the city became part of the Dominions of Sweden, which led to the foundation of the University of Tartu in 1632 by king Gustavus Adolphus of Sweden.

Imperial Russia

In 1704 the town was taken by the Russian army in the presence of tsar Peter the Great himself. As a result, around a quarter of the town and much of the fortifications were damaged. In 1708 the remainder of the fortifications and houses, including the remains of bishops castle, were blown up, all movable property was looted and all citizens deported to Russia. With the Treaty of Nystad in 1721, the city became part of the Russian Empire and was known as Derpt. Fires in the 18th century destroyed much of the medieval architecture, the Great Fire of Tartu in 1775 removed most of the buildings in the centre. The city was rebuilt along Late Baroque and Neoclassical lines including the Tartu Town Hall which was built between 1782 and 1789. In 1783 the city became the centre of Derpt uyezd within the Governorate of Livonia.

During the second half of the 19th century, Tartu was the cultural centre for Estonians in the era of Romantic nationalism. The city hosted Estonia's first song festival in 1869. Vanemuine, the first national theatre, was established in 1870. Tartu was also the setting for the foundation of the Society of Estonian Writers in 1872.

Tartu railway station was opened in 1876 when Tapa–Tartu route was built. The station building was opened in 1877. In the history of tuberculosis, in 1891 The Veterinary College at Dorpat produced seminal research using the Tuberculin test on 1,000 cattle.

In 1893, the city was officially retitled to the ancient Russian name Yuryev. The university was subsequently russified from 1895 on with the introduction of compulsory Russian in teaching. Much of the university property was relocated to Voronezh in 1918 and during the German occupation, the University worked under the name Landesuniversität Dorpat. During the Estonian War of Independence the university of Tartu was re-opened as an Estonian language university on 1 December 1919.

Independent Estonia (1918–1940)

With Estonian independence after World War I, the city officially became known by the Estonian name Tartu. At the end of the 1918–1920 Estonian War of Independence following World War I, a peace treaty between the Bolshevik Russia and Estonia was signed on 2 February 1920 in Tartu (Treaty of Tartu). With the treaty, Soviet Russia renounced territorial claims to Estonia "for all time".

In 1920, the peace treaty between Soviet Russia and Finland was also signed in Tartu.

During the interwar period Tähtvere neighbourhood was built, former Raadi Manor buildings started to house Estonian National Museum (destroyed during Tartu Offensive in 1944) and art school Pallas was opened.

German and Soviet occupations (1940–1991)

During World War II, the Stalinist Soviet Union invaded and occupied Estonia and Tartu in June 1940. Large parts of the city as well as the historical Kivisild ("Stone bridge", built in 1776–1778) over the Emajõgi river were destroyed by the retreating Soviet Army, partly in 1941 and almost completely in 1944 by then retreating German Army. Already heavily damaged, Tartu was repeatedly bombed by the Soviet air forces on 27 January 1943, on 26 February 1944, on 7–8 March 1944, and on 25–26 March 1944. After the war ended, much of the city's historic centre was left in ruins. Even the less damaged buildings in entire city blocks were demolished by the Soviet occupation authorities and large swathes of previously residential areas were turned into parks and parking lots.

After the war, the Soviet authorities declared Tartu a "closed town for foreigners", as an airbase for bombers was constructed on Raadi Airfield, in the northeast outskirts of the city. It was one of the largest military airbases in the former Eastern Bloc and housed strategic bombers carrying nuclear bombs. On one end of an older strip of the runway, the new building of Estonian National Museum was built.

Tartu Airport was opened in the south of the city in 1946. Besides the airport Estonian Aviation Academy was established in 1993. Privately owned Estonian Aviation Museum, which is 5 km to the East from the airport (7 km by car), was opened to the public in 2002.
During the 1944–1991 Soviet occupation the population of Tartu almost doubled from 57,000 to above 100,000 — due to mass immigration from Russia and other areas of the former Soviet Union, in large part because of the military airbase.

Modern era

Since Estonia regained its independence in 1991, the old town centre has been renovated. Notably, St. John's Church, in ruins since World War II, has been restored. Many new commercial and business buildings have been erected (Tartu Kaubamaja, Tasku, Emajõe kaubanduskeskus, Lõunakeskus, Kvartal, etc.). The highest residential building and local landmark Tigutorn was opened in 2008.

The AHHAA science centre relocated to a new building in 2011 and the Estonian National Museum's new main building opened in 2016.

Geography

Climate 

Tartu lies within the temperate humid continental climate zone (Dfb). The climate is rather mild considering the high latitude, largely due to the proximity of the Baltic Sea and warm airflows from the Atlantic. Nevertheless, continental influence can be felt on hot summer days and cold spells in winter, when the temperature can occasionally (but rarely) drop below . Generally, summers are warm and winters are cold.

The Tartu weather station is located in Tõravere village, which is about 20 kilometers from the city, so the actual temperature in the city may be slightly warmer than the official average temperatures.

Economy

Mostly known as a university town, Tartu is also a site of heavy industry. The food industry has traditionally been important for the town's economy and some bigger companies in the field include A. Le Coq, Tartu Mill and Salvest. Kroonpress is one of the leading printing press companies in the Baltics.

At the beginning of the 21st century, many ICT enterprises and other high-tech companies have taken a foothold in Tartu. Notable examples include Playtech Estonia, Nortal (formerly Webmedia Group), ZeroTurnaround, Tarkon, Reach-U and Raintree Estonia. Skype has an office in Tartu. The university is one of the largest employers, which explains the large proportion of highly skilled professionals – researchers, professors, doctors, and Tartu University Clinic has been considered the largest employer of Tartu.

Transport
The city is served by Tartu Airport. Tartu is connected to Riga, Tallinn, and other Estonian towns by many bus and train routes.

Population

Tartu's historic population is presented in the following table, based on data from official censuses since 1881 and Estonian Statistical Office. Note that the data up to 2011 is not directly comparable to the most recent numbers, as the methodology of compiling population statistics has changed.

Religion

Neighbourhoods

Tartu is officially divided into 17 neighbourhoods, which carry no administrative purposes. Their names and borders are defined.

Education and culture

The city is best known for being home to the University of Tartu (formerly known as the University of Dorpat), founded under King Gustavus Adolphus of Sweden in 1632. Mainly for this reason, Tartu is also – tongue-in-cheek – known as "Athens of the Emajõgi" or as "Heidelberg of the North".

Tartu is also the seat of the Estonian University of Life Sciences, the Baltic Defence College, Estonian Aviation Academy (formerly known as Tartu Aviation College), and the Estonian Ministry of Education and Research. Other notable institutions include the Supreme Court of Estonia (re-established in Tartu in autumn 1993), the Estonian Historical Archives, Estonian National Museum, Estonian Sports and Olympic Museum as well as the oldest and renowned theatre in the country, Vanemuine, where they have a well-respected ballet company as well as theatre, opera and musical productions.

In music, there exists the Tartu school of composition.

Most of the sculptures in Tartu are dedicated to historical figures. Among them the most famous are the Barclay de Tolly monument on the Barclay Square in downtown, the Kissing Students monument on the town hall square and Gustav II Adolf´s monument on the Kuningaplats.

Science
Tartu has been an intellectual centre of both Estonia and the Baltic countries for several centuries. Scholars hailing from Tartu include the pioneer of embryology Karl Ernst von Baer, a pioneer of animal behaviour studies Jakob von Uexküll, and a cultural theorist and semiotician Juri Lotman. Johann Friedrich von Eschscholtz, a Baltic German physician, naturalist, and entomologist, was born in Tartu. He was one of the earliest scientific explorers of the Pacific region, making significant collections of flora and fauna in Alaska, California, and Hawaii. Nobel Chemistry Prize laureate Wilhelm Ostwald studied and worked in Tartu. The Tartu School is one of the leading scientific schools in semiotics.

Main sights

The architecture and city planning of historical Tartu mainly go back to the pre-independence period, with Germans forming the upper and middle classes of society, and therefore contributing many architects, professors and local politicians.

Most notable are the old Lutheran St. John's Church, the 18th-century town hall, the university building, ruins of the 13th-century cathedral, the botanical gardens, the main shopping street, many buildings around the town hall square and Barclay Square.

The historical slum area called Supilinn (Soup Town) is located on the bank of river Emajõgi, near the town centre and is regarded as one of the few surviving "poor" neighbourhoods of 19th-century Europe. At the moment Supilinn is being rapidly renovated, undergoing a slow transformation from the historic slum into a prestigious high-class neighborhood. The active community embodied by the Supilinn Society is committed to preserving the heritage.

The Second World War destroyed large parts of the city centre and during the Soviet occupation, many new buildings were erected – notably the new Vanemuine Theater. The effects of the war are still witnessed by the relative abundance of parks and greenery in the historic centre. Typical Soviet-style neighbourhoods of blocks of high-rise flats were built between World War II and the restoration of Estonian independence in 1991, the largest such district being Annelinn.

Presently, Tartu is also known for several modern buildings of the "steel, concrete and glass" variation, but has managed to retain a mix of old and new buildings in the centre of town. Notable examples include the Tigutorn Tower and the Emajõe Centre, both built during the current period of independence; Tartu's tallest and second tallest towers, respectively. Tartu's large student population means that it has a comparatively thriving nightlife, with many nightclubs, bars, and restaurants, including the world's highest-ceiling pub, in the historic Gunpowder Cellar of Tartu.

Annually, in the summer, Tartu hosts the Hanseatic Days festival to celebrate its Hanseatic heritage. The festival includes events such as handicraft markets, historic workshops and jousting tournaments.

Sports

Tartu is the home for basketball club Tartu Ülikool/Rock, which participates in the Korvpalli Meistriliiga and the Latvian-Estonian Basketball League.

Football club JK Tammeka Tartu, one of the Meistriliiga clubs, is located in Tartu. Their home stadium is the Tamme Staadion, which has a capacity of 1600. The city is also home to the Tartu JK Welco and FC Santos Tartu clubs, which play in the Esiliiga, the second division.

Tartu has a professional volleyball club, Bigbank Tartu, as well as the handball team, the Tartu Ülikool/Glassdrive, which plays in the second division of Estonian handball.

Tartu is also the hometown of Clement "Puppey" Ivanov, captain of Team Secret, a professional Dota 2 team. He won the first International, and was runner-up two years in a row with Natus Vincere.

The 2017 World Orienteering Championships were held in Tartu.

The annual running event Tartu Sügisjooks takes place in Tartu.

Notable people

 Andrus Ansip (1956), politician, former Prime Minister of Estonia
 Lauri Aus (1970–2003), professional road cyclist
 Karl Ernst von Baer (1792–1876), Baltic German scientist and explorer
 George Browne, (1698–1792), Irish-born Governor of Dorpat 
 Karl Ernst Claus (1796–1864), Baltic German chemist and botanist
 Jaan Einasto (1929), astrophysicist
 Elisabeth Erm (1993), fashion model
 Markko Märtin (1975), rally driver
 George Hackenschmidt (1877–1968), strongman, professional wrestler, writer and philosopher
 Adolf von Harnack (1851-1930), German lutheran theologian and church historian
 Else Hueck-Dehio, Baltic German writer
 Carl Robert Jakobson (1841–1882), writer, politician and teacher
 Maarja Jakobson (1977), actress
 Martin Järveoja (1987), rally co-driver
 Rasmus Kaljujärv (1981), actor
 Alar Karis (1958), biologist and the 6th President of Estonia
 Kerr Kriisa (2001), basketball player
 Sally von Kügelgen (1860–1928), painter
 Leonid Kulik (1883–1942), Russian mineralogist
 Emil Mattiesen (1875–1939), composer, pianist and philosopher
 Laura Põldvere (1988), singer
 Elsa Ratassepp (1893–1972), actress
 Eno Raud (1928-1996), children's author
 Zofia Romer (1885–1972), Polish painter
 Kristina Šmigun-Vähi (1977), cross-country skier
 Rein Taaramäe (1987), professional road cyclist
 Aino Talvi (1909–1992), actress
 Ants Veetõusme (born 1949), politician (former Mayor of Tartu) and financial figure
 Siim-Sander Vene (born 1990), basketball player

Gallery

See also
 Immaculate Conception Church, Tartu
 Pigcam, wild game feeding webcam, in a forest near Tartu
 University of Tartu
 Tartu University Library
 St Mary's Church, Tartu
 St Paul's Church, Tartu
 St Peter's Church, Tartu

Sources

Notes

References

Further reading

External links

 City of Tartu
 Tourism website
 University of Tartu
 Weather in Tartu

 
Cities and towns in Estonia
Members of the Hanseatic League
Kreis Dorpat
Populated places in Tartu County
Populated places established in the 5th century
1030 establishments